Barbara O'Neil (July 17, 1910 – September 3, 1980) was an American film and stage actress. She appeared in the film Gone with the Wind (1939) and was nominated for the Academy Award for Best Supporting Actress for her performance in All This, and Heaven Too (1940).

Early years
O'Neil was born in St. Louis, Missouri, the daughter of Barbara Blackman O'Neil and David O'Neil, a "lumber baron" and poet. Her mother was a socialite and suffragist. She spent her childhood mostly in Europe and graduated from Sarah Lawrence College. Her maternal grandmother was Carrie Horton Blackman, a successful portrait painter. Her parents had a son, David, who died before O'Neil was born.

Career 
O'Neil began her acting career in summer stock. In July 1931, Bretaigne Windust, Charles Leatherbee (the grandson of Charles Richard Crane), and Joshua Logan, the three directors of the University Players, a three-year-old summer stock company at West Falmouth on Cape Cod, were looking for a leading lady for their repertory season that winter in Baltimore. At the suggestion of George Pierce Baker, they auditioned and hired O'Neil, one of his talented students at the Yale School of Drama. Romances born of the University Players led to three marriages: actress Margaret Sullavan to Henry Fonda for a few months in 1932, director/actor Joshua Logan's younger sister Mary Lee Logan to Charles Leatherbee, and Joshua Logan to Barbara O'Neil, briefly, in the early 1940s. O'Neil never remarried. She made her Broadway debut in a 1932 play about Carrie Nation. Her other stage credits include originating the role of Madam Serena Merle in a Broadway adaptation of The Portrait of a Lady in 1954.

O'Neil debuted in the film Stella Dallas (1937), and was cast in the role of Ellen O'Hara, Scarlett O'Hara's mother, in Gone with the Wind (1939) though she was only three years older than her onscreen daughter (Vivien Leigh) after her role was turned down by Lillian Gish. The following year, she appeared in All This, and Heaven Too (as the wife of Charles Boyer); she was nominated for the Academy Award for Best Supporting Actress for the role of the domineering and jealous Duchesse de Praslin.

Her later films include Shining Victory (1941), I Remember Mama (1948), Secret Beyond the Door (1948) and two of director Otto Preminger's films, Whirlpool (1949) and Angel Face (1952). She also appeared in The Nun's Story (1959), starring Audrey Hepburn.

Death 
O'Neil died from a heart attack at the age of 70 on September 3, 1980, at her home in Cos Cob, Connecticut.

Filmography

References

External links

1910 births
1980 deaths
20th-century American actresses
Actresses from St. Louis
American film actresses
American stage actresses
Yale University alumni
Yale School of Drama alumni